Black Like Me is a 1964 American drama film based on the 1961 book Black Like Me by John Howard Griffin. The journalist disguised himself to pass as an African-American man for six weeks in 1959 in the Deep South to report on life in the segregated society from the other side of the color line. The film was directed by Carl Lerner and the screenplay was written by Carl and Gerda Lerner. The film stars James Whitmore, Sorrell Booke and Roscoe Lee Browne.

The DVD was released December 11, 2012 in North America from Video Services Corp. The DVD includes a documentary titled Uncommon Vision about John Howard Griffin, the journalist on which the main character is based.

Plot

John Finley Horton (James Whitmore) is a liberal white journalist who darkens his face and hands (and to some degree his body) using various means, sufficiently to pass for a black man. He travels for several weeks in the Deep South in order to report from the other side of the color line in the segregated society. He spends time in places from New Orleans to Atlanta, and encounters racism from both white and black people.

Cast
 James Whitmore as John Finley Horton (Black Like Me author John Howard Griffin)
 Sorrell Booke as Dr. Jackson
 Roscoe Lee Browne as Christophe
 Al Freeman, Jr. as Thomas Newcomb
 Will Geer as truck driver
 Robert Gerringer as Ed Saunders
 Clifton James as Eli Carr
 John Marriott as Hodges
 Thelma Oliver as Georgie
 Lenka Petersen as Lucy Horton
 Richard Ward as Burt Wilson

Reception

Critical reception for the film has been mixed. Bosley Crowther of The New York Times described the film as "melodramatic and unsubtle". He said it failed to place the viewer inside an African American's skin, and to convince the audience that the protagonist "is truly passing for black".

Reviewing the film after the 2012 DVD release, Leonard Maltin awarded the film a positive 3 out of 4 stars. He said that, although some aspects of the film felt dated, the film's themes were still timely.

Release
The film made its DVD debut on February 12, 2002 by VCI Home Video. It later was re-released by Video Service Corp on December 11, 2012.

See also
List of American films of 1964

References

External links
 
 
 

1964 films
1964 drama films
Civil rights movement in film
American independent films
American black-and-white films
Blackface minstrel shows and films
African-American drama films
Films about race and ethnicity
Films about racism
American films based on actual events
Films based on non-fiction books
Films set in Atlanta
Films set in New Orleans
Films set in Texas
Films set in the 1950s
Films shot in Florida
Films shot in New York (state)
Films shot in Washington, D.C.
1960s English-language films
1960s American films